The Admiralty Islands languages are a group of some thirty Oceanic languages spoken on the Admiralty Islands. They may include Yapese, which has proven difficult to classify.

Languages
According to Lynch, Ross, & Crowley (2002), the structure of the family is:

Eastern
Manus
Southeast: Baluan-Pam, Lenkau, Lou, Nauna, Penchal
Western
Northern Kaniet and Southern Kaniet (†)
Seimat
Wuvulu-Aua (as two languages)

As noted, Yapese and Nguluwan may be part of the Admiralty Islands languages as well.

References

 Blust, Robert (2007). The prenasalised trills of Manus. In Language description, history, and development: Linguistic indulgence in memory of Terry Crowley, ed. by Jeff Siegel, John Lynch, and Diana Eades, pp. 297–311. Creole Language Library vol. 30. Amsterdam: John Benjamins.
 Bowern, Claire (2011). Sivisa Titan: Sketch grammar, texts, vocabulary based on material collected by P. Josef Meier and Po Minis. Oceanic Linguistics Special Publication No. 38. Honolulu: University of Hawai‘i Press.
 Hamel, Patricia J. (1994). A grammar and lexicon of Loniu, Papua New Guinea. Pacific Linguistics C-103. Canberra: The Australian National University. 275 pp.
 Hamel, Patricia J. (1993). Serial verbs in Loniu and an evolving preposition. Oceanic Linguistics 32:111–132.
 Ross, M. D. (1988). Proto Oceanic and the Austronesian languages of Western Melanesia. Pacific Linguistics C-98. Canberra: The Australian National University. 487 pp.

 
Oceanic languages
Languages of Papua New Guinea
Admiralty Islands